Anthony Ian Clark (born 1 November 1977) is an English former badminton player. He is a mixed and men's doubles silver medalists at the 2006 World Championships. Clark won the mixed doubles title at the 2008 European Championships, and was part of the England winning team at the 2002 Commonwealth Games.

Career

2004 Summer Olympics 
Clark competed in badminton at the 2004 Summer Olympics in men's doubles with partner Nathan Robertson. They defeated Patapol Ngernsrisuk and Sudket Prapakamol of Thailand in the first round, then were defeated in the round of 16 by Eng Hian and Flandy Limpele of Indonesia.

2006 World Champs 
Clark reached the mixed doubles final at the 2006 IBF World Championships together with Donna Kellogg, losing the final against Gail Emms and Nathan Robertson. He also lost the men's doubles final in the same event together with Robert Blair.

2008 Olympics 
Currently living in Coalville, Leicestershire, Clark represented Great Britain at the 2008 Summer Olympics in the mixed doubles badminton event.

Achievements

World Championships 
Men's doubles

Mixed doubles

Commonwealth Games 
Men's doubles

Mixed doubles

European Championships 
Men's doubles

Mixed doubles

BWF Superseries 
The BWF Superseries, which was launched on 14 December 2006 and implemented in 2007, is a series of elite badminton tournaments, sanctioned by the Badminton World Federation (BWF). BWF Superseries levels are Superseries and Superseries Premier. A season of Superseries consists of twelve tournaments around the world that have been introduced since 2011. Successful players are invited to the Superseries Finals, which are held at the end of each year.

Men's doubles

Mixed doubles

  BWF Superseries Finals tournament
  BWF Superseries Premier tournament
  BWF Superseries tournament

IBF World Grand Prix 
The World Badminton Grand Prix has been sanctioned by the International Badminton Federation from 1983 to 2006.

Men's doubles

Mixed doubles

BWF International Challenge/Series 
Men's doubles

Mixed doubles

  BWF International Challenge tournament
  BWF/IBF International Series tournament

References

External links 
 
 
 
 
 
 

1977 births
Living people
People from Coalville
Sportspeople from Leicestershire
Sportspeople from Derby
English male badminton players
Badminton players at the 2004 Summer Olympics
Badminton players at the 2008 Summer Olympics
Olympic badminton players of Great Britain
Commonwealth Games gold medallists for England
Commonwealth Games silver medallists for England
Commonwealth Games bronze medallists for England
Badminton players at the 2002 Commonwealth Games
Badminton players at the 2006 Commonwealth Games
Badminton players at the 2010 Commonwealth Games
Commonwealth Games medallists in badminton
Medallists at the 2002 Commonwealth Games
Medallists at the 2006 Commonwealth Games
Medallists at the 2010 Commonwealth Games